Everhardus Johannes Potgieter (June 27, 1808February 3, 1875) was a Dutch prose writer and poet, who was born at Zwolle in Overijssel.

Biography 
He started life in a merchant's office at Antwerp. In 1831 he made a journey to Sweden, described in two volumes, which appeared at Amsterdam in 1836–1840. Soon afterwards he settled in Amsterdam, engaged in commercial pursuits on his own account, but with more and more inclination towards literature. With Heije, the popular poet of Holland in those days, and Bakhuizen van den Brink, the rising historian (see also Groen van Prinsterer), Potgieter founded De Muzen ( The Muses, 1834–1836), a literary review, which was, however, soon superseded by De Gids ("The Guide"), a monthly, which became the leading magazine of Holland. In it he wrote, mostly under the initials of W. Dg, a great number of articles and poems.

The first collected edition of his poems (1832–1868) appeared in 2 volumes (Haarlem, 1868–1875), preceded by some of his contributions to De Gids, in 2 volumes also (Haarlem, 1864), and followed by 3 volumes of his Studien en Schetsen ("Studies and Sketches," Haarlem, 1879). Soon after his death a more comprehensive edition of Potgieter's Verspreide en Nagelaten Werken ("Miscellaneous and Posthumous Works") was published in 8 volumes by his friend and literary executor, Johan C Zimmerman (Haarlem, 1875–1877), who likewise supervised a more complete edition of Potgieter's writings which appeared at Haarlem in 1885 1890 in 19 volumes.

Of Potgieter's Het Noorden in Omtrekken en Tafreelen ("The North in Outlines and Pictures") the third edition was issued in 1882, and an edition de luxe of his poems followed at Haarlem in 1893. Under the title of Personen en Onderwerpen ("Persons and Subjects") many of Potgieter's criticisms had collectively appeared in 3 volumes at Haarlem in 1885, with an introduction by Conrad Busken-Huet.

Potgieter's favourite master among the Dutch classics was Hooft, whose peculiarities in style and language he admired and imitated. The same vein of altruistic, if often exaggerated and biased, abhorrence of the wonted conventionalities of literary life runs through all his writings, even through his private correspondence with Huet, parts of which have been published.

Potgieter remained to his death the irreconcilable enemy of the Dutch Jan Salie, as the Dutchman is nicknamed who does not believe in the regeneration of the Dutch people. Potgieter held up the Netherlanders of the golden age of the 16th and 17th centuries as models to be emulated. In these views he essentially differed from Huet. Yet the two friends worked harmoniously together; and when Potgieter reluctantly gave up De Gids in 1865, it was Huet whom he chose as his successor.

Both then proceeded to Italy, and were present at the Dante festivities at Florence, which in Potgieter's case resulted in a poem in twenty stanzas, Florence (Haarlem, 1868). According to a criticism in the Encyclopædia Britannica Eleventh Edition, Potgieter's influence in Holland was very marked and beneficial; but his own style, that of ultra-purist, was at times somewhat forced, stilted and not always easily understood.

References

External links
 
 
 

1808 births
1875 deaths
Dutch male poets
People from Zwolle
19th-century Dutch poets
19th-century Dutch male writers